Ayatollah Sayyid Radhi al-Husayni al-Shirazi (29 March 1927 – 1 December 2021), also known as Razi Shirazi, was an Iraqi-Iranian Shia who was a jurist, philosopher and theologian. He was the great-grandson of the renowned Shia jurist, Mirza Shirazi, the pioneer of the Tobacco protest. He was the Imam of the Shifa mosque in Yousefabad.

Early life and education
Shirazi was born in Najaf, Iraq. He hailed from the prominent religious al-Shirazi family. His father was Sayyid Muhammad-Husayn al-Shirazi (d. 1955), the son of grand Ayatollah Mirza Ali Agha al-Shirazi (d. 1936). His mother was the daughter of Sheikh Muhammad-Kadhim al-Shirazi (d. 1948). Shirazi is the eldest of eight siblings, four brothers and three sisters. His brother Mostafa is a doctor of agricultural sciences, living in Oregon. His brother Bagher is a doctor in architecture and specialises in Islamic architecture.

Shirazi began his religious education at a young age in Najaf, studying under his grandfather Sheikh Muhammad-Kadhim al-Shirazi, Sayyid Abu al-Qasim al-Khoei, Sheikh Husayn al-Hilli and Sheikh Baqir al-Zanjani. He then immigrated to Iran, and studied under Abul Hasan Sharani, Muhammad Taqi Amoli, Fazel Tooni, Mirza Ahmad Ashtiani, Shekh Mojtaba Lankarani, Sayyid Abu al-Hasan Rafiee, and Mirza Mehdi Elahi Qomshehee.

He gained ijtihad in 1953, being awarded permits by Sayyid Jamal al-Din al-Golpayegani, Sayyid Abd al-Hadi al-Shirazi, Mirza Abu al-Hasan al-Rafiee, and Sheikh Muhammad-Husayn Kashif al-Ghitaa'.

Religious career
Shirazi has taught in many different places, such as the Marvi School, the Sepahsalar School (University of Motahhari), and the University of Tehran as a Theology faculty member. Shirazi was the representative of grand Ayatollah Hossein Borujerdi in the international congress of al-Aqsa Mosque. He was the Imam of the Shifa mosque in Yousefabad in Tehran. As part of his Islamic missionary work, Shirazi has converted just over 500 people into the Muslim faith.

Works
Shirazi has written many works on the subjects of philosophy, theology and jurisprudence. 

Some of his works include:

 Explaining the Poems of Wisdom (2 volumes, Sharhe Manzoumeh)
 Al Esfar An Al-Asfar (2 volumes),
 Criticism and Planning of Ideas, Zolale Hekmat (Commentary of Quran), 
 Zolale Hekmat (ethics).

Death 
Shirazi died in Tehran on Wednesday, December 1, 2021, aged 94. He was buried in the Imam Ali Shrine in Najaf.

See also

 Islamic philosophy
 Mirza Shirazi
 Taqi Tabatabaei Qomi

References

1927 births
2021 deaths
20th-century Iranian philosophers
Iranian jurists
People from Najaf